Bäcker or Baecker is a German surname meaning "baker". Notable people with the surname include:

Fabian Bäcker (born 1990), German professional footballer
Pär Bäcker (born 1982), Swedish professional ice hockey player
Ronald Baecker (born 1942), professor of Computer Science, University of Toronto
Rudolf Bäcker (1914–2005), combat medic in the German armed forces during World War II

See also
Backer
Baker (surname)

German-language surnames
Occupational surnames